Setumadhavarao Pagdi or Sethu Madhav Rao Pagdi (27 August 1910 – 14 October 1994) was an Indian civil servant, a polyglot, an accomplished historian and a distinguished man of letters specialised in modern Maratha history, especially the history of Shivaji. He also worked as the secretary of Government of Maharashtra. As a secretary he did his job fairly well. Setu Madhavrao was well versed in Marathi, English, Hindi, Sanskrit, Urdu and Persian, apart from Kannada, which was his mother tongue. As a linguist he discovered the sound system and the Grammar of tribal dialect called Gaudi. He was one who served the cause of Marathi against all odds in pre and post - Independent Hyderabad state. Following in the footsteps of the noted Bengali historian Jadunath Sarkar, Setu Madhavrao wrote Shivaji's biography in Marathi and English and the theory enkindled the spirit of nationalism in his readers.

The Government of India awarded him the civilian honour of the Padma Bhushan in 1992.

Early life 
Madhavrao was born on 27 August 1910 in Nilanga, Hyderabad State (now part of Maharashtra) into a Deshastha Madhva Brahmin family of landlords. He was educated in Gulbarga, Osmanabad, and Pune. He obtained his Bachelor of Arts degree from Banaras Hindu University in 1930 and Master of Arts degree from Allahabad University three years later.

He was well-versed in Marathi, English, Hindi, Sanskrit, Urdu and Persian,

Literary works

In English
 Among the Gonds of Adilabad, 1949
 Grammar of the Kolami Language, 1950
 Grammar of the Gondi Language, 1954
 Tribal Welfare in Adilabad, 1950
 History of Freedom Struggle in Hyderabad: 1800-1920 (Edited work in three volumes), 1956
 Eighteenth Century Deccan, 1963
 Maratha Mughal Relations: 1680-1707, 1966
 Studies in Maratha History Vol. 2, 1971
 Srinath Madhavji Shinde alias Alijah Mahadji Scindia of Gwalior

In Marathi
 Usha, a collection of short stories, 1938
 Ashokachi Pane, a collection of essays, 1941
 Warangalche Kakatiya Raje, 1946
 Sufi Sampraday, Tatvadnyan Ani Karya, 1953
 Mirza Ghalib Ani Tyachya Ghazala, 1958
 Panipatcha Sangram, 1961
 Marathe Va Aurangzeb, 1963
 Mogal Maratha Sangharsh (मोगल मराठा संघर्ष), 1965
 Tahmasnama, 1967
 Shivacharitra: Ek Abhyas, 1971
 Chhatrapati Shivaji, 1974
 भारतीय मुसलमानः शोध आणि बोध
 १८५७चे आणखी काही पैलू

References

Bibliography

Marathi-language writers
Marathi people
20th-century Indian essayists
Indian male essayists
1910 births
1994 deaths
20th-century Indian historians
Recipients of the Padma Bhushan in literature & education